The Subprefecture of Santo Amaro is one of 32 subprefectures of the city of São Paulo, Brazil.  It comprises three districts: Santo Amaro, Campo Belo, and Campo Grande.

Once part of an independent municipality, this subprefecture hosts the Congonhas Airport, the Apple Store of São Paulo and the Brazilian headquarters of many companies such as Deloitte, SAP, Oracle, KPMG, Cargill, Electrolux and PepsiCo, as well as the Brazilian companies Banco Votorantim, NET and Vivo. This subprefecture also features many theatres and concert halls and has the famous cable-stayed Octávio Frias de Oliveira Bridge, one of the landmarks of São Paulo, connecting it to the subprefecture of Butantã, in the other side of the river.

See also
 Roman Catholic Diocese of Santo Amaro

References

External links
 Roman Catholic Diocese of Santo Amaro

Subprefectures of São Paulo